The following is a list of notable deaths in February 2016.

Entries for each day are listed alphabetically by surname. A typical entry lists information in the following sequence:
Name, age, country of citizenship and reason for notability, established cause of death, reference.

February 2016

1
Wasil Ahmad, 11, Afghan child soldier, shot.
Israr Ali, 88, Pakistani Test cricketer.
Ali Beratlıgil, 84, Turkish football player and coach.
Francis Buckley, 94, Canadian business executive (Buckley's).
Jon Bunch, 45, American rock musician (Sense Field, Further Seems Forever), suicide by drug overdose.
Miguel Gutiérrez, 84, Mexican footballer (Club Atlas).
Li Xiuren, 94, Chinese politician.
Murray Louis, 89, American modern dancer and choreographer.
Kelly McGarry, 33, New Zealand mountain biker, cardiac arrest.
Óscar Humberto Mejía Victores, 85, Guatemalan military officer and politician, President (1983–1986).
Francis Ormsby-Gore, 6th Baron Harlech, 61, British peer, member of the House of Lords (1985–1999).
Bernard Piras, 73, French politician, member of the Senate for Drôme (1996–2014), Mayor of Bourg-lès-Valence (2001–2014), cancer.
Paul Pholeros, 62, Australian architect.
Jaime Powell, 63, Argentine paleontologist.
Tom Pugh, 78, English cricketer.
Kunigal Ramanath, 83, Indian actor.
Thomas Tigue, 70, American politician, member of the Pennsylvania House of Representatives (1981–2006), lung cancer.
Dušan Velkaverh, 72, Slovenian lyricist.
Sir Peter Whiteley, 95, British general in the Royal Marines, Lieutenant Governor of Jersey (1979–1984).

2
Robert Beiner, 65, American television sports director.
Heinz Bohlen, 80, German microwave electronics and communications engineer (Bohlen–Pierce scale).
Seth Cardew, 81, English studio potter.
Abram Cohen, 91, American Olympic fencer (1956).
Bob Elliott, 92, American comedian (Bob and Ray) and actor (Get a Life), throat cancer.
Jim Goode, 71, American restaurateur.
Dag Gundersen, 88, Norwegian linguist and lexicographer.
Halling, 24, American racehorse.
Intizar Hussain, 92, Pakistani writer.
Chris Kenny, 78, Irish-born New Zealand boxing coach.
Luiz Felipe Lampreia, 74, Brazilian diplomat, Minister of External Relations (1995–2001).
Aldo Bufi Landi, 92, Italian actor (Four Flies on Grey Velvet, The Magliari, The Bandit of Tacca Del Lupo).
Gérald Laniel, 91, Canadian politician, MP for Beauharnois—Salaberry (1962–1984).
Rebecca Masika Katsuva, 49, Congolese women's rights activist.
Mubeen Mughal, 23, Pakistani cricketer.
Yasushi Nirasawa, 52, Japanese concept designer and illustrator (Kamen Rider Kabuto, Hellboy, Soulcalibur), kidney failure.
Mike Oehler, 78, American author.
Manuel Tenenbaum, 81, Uruguayan historian, President of the Latin American Jewish Congress (1978–2007).
Marcus Turner, 59, New Zealand folk singer and television presenter.

3
Ernesto Alais, 86, Argentine Olympic sports shooter.
Joe Alaskey, 63, American voice actor (Looney Tunes, Rugrats, Casper), cancer.
Big Kap, 45, American hip hop DJ (Tunnel), heart attack.
Mark Farren, 33, Irish football player (Derry City), brain cancer.
Richie Giachetti, 76, American boxing trainer.
John Hirst, 73, Australian historian.
Balram Jakhar, 92, Indian politician, Speaker of the Lok Sabha (1980–1989).
Michał Janiszewski, 89, Polish politician and army officer.
Brandon Astor Jones, 72, American criminal, execution by lethal injection.
József Kasza, 70, Serbian politician and economist.
Brad Kent, 61, Canadian musician (DOA, Avengers), complications from pneumonia.
Suat Mamat, 85, Turkish footballer (Galatasaray, national team).
K. S. Paripoornan, 83, Indian judge, multiple organ failure.
Valery Postnikov, 70, Russian ice hockey player and coach.
Mercedes Richards, 60, Jamaican astronomer and physicist.
John P. Riley Jr., 95, American ice hockey player (national team) and coach (1960 Olympic Champions US national team).
Edith Skom, 86, American novelist.
Alba Solís, 88, Argentine singer and actress.
Saulius Sondeckis, 87, Lithuanian violinist and conductor.
Andy Thompson, 91, Canadian politician, Leader of the Ontario Liberal Party (1964–1966).
Arnold Weiberg-Aurdal, 90, Norwegian politician.

4
Leslie Bassett, 93, American composer, recipient of the Pulitzer Prize for Music (1966).
Sonia Borg, 85, Austrian-born Australian screenwriter (Women of the Sun, Storm Boy).
Marlow Cook, 89, American politician, Senator from Kentucky (1968–1974), complications from a heart attack.
Don Davis, 82, American gun shop owner.
Joe Dowell, 76, American pop singer ("Wooden Heart"), heart attack.
William Gaskill, 85, British theatre director.
Harry Glasgow, 76, Scottish footballer (Clyde).
Harry Harpham, 61, British politician, MP for Sheffield Brightside and Hillsborough (since 2015), cancer.
Bob Harrison, 78, American football player (San Francisco 49ers).
Jimmie Haskell, 79, American composer and orchestrator (The Color Purple, Big, Land of the Lost).
Paddy Kehoe, 93, Irish Gaelic football and hurling manager and player.
Galina Leontyeva, 74, Russian volleyball player, Olympic champion (1968, 1972).
Katie May, 34, American model, stroke. 
Kristine Miller, 90, American actress (I Walk Alone, Jungle Patrol, Too Late for Tears). (death announced on this date)
Dave Mirra, 41, American BMX rider, X Games winner (1997, 1999, 2000, 2001, 2002, 2004, 2005), suicide by gunshot.
Edgar Mitchell, 85, American astronaut (Apollo 14). 
Sir Jeremy Morse, 87, British banker and crossword compiler.
Miguel Roa, 72, Spanish conductor.
Axl Rotten, 44, American professional wrestler (ECW), heroin overdose.
Haro Senft, 87, German filmmaker (Kahl).
David Sloan, 74, Northern Irish footballer (Scunthorpe United, Oxford United, Walsall).
Ulf Söderblom, 85, Finnish conductor.
Howard G. Swafford, 96, American politician.
Dimitris Tsaloumas, 94, Greek-born Australian poet.
Lorna Jorgenson Wendt, 72, American women's equality advocate.
Edgar Whitcomb, 98, American politician, Governor of Indiana (1969–1973).
Maurice White, 74, American songwriter and musician (Earth, Wind & Fire), complications from Parkinson's disease.

5
Markand Bhatt, 87, Indian theatre director and actor.
Bill Birchfield, 80, American politician, member of Florida House of Representatives for the 21st district (1971–1974).
Ciriaco Cañete, 96, Filipino martial artist, prostate cancer.
Miriam Goldman Cedarbaum, 86, American judge, District Court for the Southern District of New York (1986–1998), stroke.
Ray Colcord, 66, American film and television composer (Boy Meets World, The Facts of Life, Dinosaurs), pancreatic cancer.
Leo Foley, 87, American politician, Minnesota State Senator (1997–2011).
Bodil Malmsten, 71, Swedish poet and novelist.
John Lewis Mitchell, 97, British Royal Air Force pilot.
Tayeb Saddiki, 77, Moroccan playwright.
C. V. Subramanian, 91, Indian scientist.
Carl E. Wang, 85, Norwegian politician.

6
Milton V. Backman, 88, American historian.
Alastair Biggar, 69, Scottish rugby union player (national team, British and Irish Lions, London Scottish), cancer.
Jules Boes, 88, Belgian Olympic basketball player.
Luciano Conati, 65, Italian racing cyclist.
David John de Laubenfels, 90, American botanist.
Robin Chandler Duke, 92, American social advocate and diplomat, Ambassador to Norway (2000–2001). 
Dan Gerson, 49, American screenwriter (Monsters, Inc., Big Hero 6, Chicken Little), brain cancer.
Winifred Green, 78, American civil rights activist.
Dan Hicks, 74, American singer-songwriter, liver cancer.
York Larese, 77, American basketball player (Chicago Packers, Philadelphia Warriors) and coach (New York Nets).
Anisa Makhlouf, 86, Syrian political matriarch, First Lady (1971–2000).
James Moore, 99, American baseball player (Newark Eagles).
Emanuel Parzen, 86, American statistician.
Sam Spence, 88, American composer (NFL Films).
Giacomo Tachis, 82, Italian oenologist (Super Tuscans).
Sudhir Tailang, 55, Indian cartoonist, brain cancer.
John L. Tishman, 90, American property developer (Tishman Realty & Construction).
Eddy Wally, 83, Belgian singer, cerebral hemorrhage.
David Weinrib, 91, American artist.

7
Juliette Benzoni, 95, French novelist.
Konstantinos Despotopoulos, 102, Greek philosopher and politician.
Andrew Glaze, 95, American poet.
Andrew Hintz, 52, New Zealand cricketer.
Dogomar Martínez, 86, Uruguayan Olympic boxer.
Emilyano Ochagaviya, 70, Russian theater actor.
Redding Pitt, 71, American attorney and politician.
Thomas Rea, 86, American dermatologist and leprosy researcher, cancer.
Roger Willemsen, 60, German author, essayist and TV presenter.

8
Sikiru Adesina, 44–45, Nigerian film actor and director.
Amelia Bence, 101, Argentine actress (The Gaucho War, A Sangre Fría, Alfonsina).
Jakov Bienenfeld, 67, Croatian executive.
Michael Brick, 41, American journalist and songwriter, colon cancer.
Charles C. Campbell, 68, American army general.
Ken Delo, 77, American singer (The Delo and Daly Show).
John Disley, 87, Welsh steeplechase runner, Olympic bronze medallist (1952) and co-founder of the London Marathon.
Johnny Duncan, 92, American actor (Batman and Robin).
Nida Fazli, 77, Indian poet, respiratory problems.
Giuliano Ferraris, 80, Italian Olympic ice hockey player (1956).
*Luigi Ferrari Bravo, 82, Italian academic and judge, International Court of Justice (1995–1997).
Margaret Forster, 77, English novelist (Georgy Girl) and biographer, cancer.
Norman Hudis, 93, English screenwriter (Carry On).
August P. Mardesich, 95, American politician, member of the Washington House of Representatives (1950–1963) and Senate (1963–1978).
Samuel Rappaport, 83, American politician, member of the Pennsylvania House of Representatives (1971–1984).
Willie Richardson, 76, American football player (Jackson State, Baltimore Colts, Miami Dolphins).
Viggo Rivad, 93, Danish photographer.
Roy Señeres, 68, Filipino politician and diplomat, Ambassador to the United Arab Emirates (1994–1998), complications of diabetes.
William Donald Stiehl, 90, American federal judge, District Court for the Southern District of Illinois (1986–1996).
William Stowe, 75, American rower, Olympic champion (1964). 
Zdravko Tolimir, 67, Bosnian Serb military commander in the Bosnian War.
Violette Verdy, 82, French ballerina.
Leon Vilaincour, 92, Polish-born British painter.

9
J. B. Danquah-Adu, 50, Ghanaian politician and MP, stabbed.
Myer Bloom, 87, Canadian physicist.
Vittorio Di Prima, 74, Italian actor and voice actor.
Wayne England, 56, English artist (Magic: The Gathering).
Claudie Flament, 85, French Olympic hurdler.
Bob Halverson, 78, Australian politician, Speaker of the House of Representatives (1996–1998), MP (1984–1998), cancer.
Michael Hanlon, 51, British science journalist, heart attack.
Roy Harris, 82, British folk singer. 
André van den Heuvel, 88, Dutch actor (Hamelen, De rode zwaan, Lifespan), two-time winner of the Louis d'Or.
Sushil Koirala, 76, Nepalese politician, Prime Minister (2014–2015), President of Congress (since 2010), pneumonia.
Edwin McDonough, 72, American actor (Kinsey, Reversal of Fortune).
Alethea McGrath, 95, Australian actress (Star Wars: Episode II – Attack of the Clones, Prisoner, Knowing).
Graham Moore, 74, Welsh footballer (Charlton Athletic, Cardiff City).
Quan Minyu, 12, Chinese singer, DIPG.
Edgar Riek, 95, Australian entomologist and wine pioneer.
Jagnandan Singh, 87, Kenyan Olympic hockey player.
Elizabeth Joan Smith, 88, Canadian politician, MPP for London South (1985–1990), brain injury from fall.
Donald E. Thorin, 81, American cinematographer (Thief, Purple Rain, Scent of a Woman).
Leslie Thornton, 90, English sculptor. 
Jan Zoon, 92, Dutch politician, Senator (1969–1991).
Alexandru Vulpe, 84, Romanian historian, archaeologist and academician (Romanian Academy).
Nore Westin, 78, Swedish Olympic biathlete.

10
Jakob Aano, 95, Norwegian politician, MP (1965–1985).
David Boykett, 81, Australian rower, Olympic bronze medallist (1956).
Claude Jeancolas, 66, French author.
Ian Cowap, 65, English cricketer (Cheshire), cancer.
Yuriy Dumchev, 57, Russian Olympic Soviet discus thrower (1980, 1988), world record holder (1983–1986).
Leo Ehlen, 62, Dutch footballer (Roda JC).
Hildesuse Gaertner, 93, German alpine skier and politician.
Phil Gartside, 63, English businessman and football chairman (Bolton Wanderers), cancer.
Rafiqul Hossain, 80, Bangladeshi politician, MP (1986–1988).
Anatoli Ilyin, 84, Russian Soviet football player (Spartak Moscow), Olympic champion (1956).
Bayard Johnson, 63, American screenwriter (Tarzan and the Lost City), cancer.
Drew Lewis, 84, American business executive and politician, Secretary of Transportation (1981–1983), complications of pneumonia.  
Asami Nagakiya, 30, Japanese musician, strangled.
Lennie Pond, 75, American race car driver, cancer.
Eliseo Prado, 86, Argentine footballer (national team, Club Atlético River Plate).
Christopher Rush, 50, American illustrator (Magic: The Gathering).
Günter Schröter, 88, German football player and coach. 
John Spencer, 81, New Zealand businessman. 
Fatima Surayya Bajia, 85, Pakistani novelist.
Richard Unis, 87, American judge, stroke.
Bob Wielinga, 70, Dutch academic.
Abdel-Bari Zamzami, 73, Moroccan religious leader, cancer.

11
Warner Batchelor, 81, Australian Olympic boxer.
Les Belshaw, 88, British rugby league player.
Sir Timothy Bevan, 88, British banker, chairman of Barclays (1981–1987).
Naushaba Burney, 83, Pakistani journalist.
Jakob Denzinger, 91, Croatian concentration camp guard.
John Gagnon, 84, American sociologist, pancreatic cancer.
Charles Garabedian, 92, American artist, prostate cancer.
William Haze, 49, American actor (One Tree Hill, The Punisher, Jeepers Creepers).
Thomas N. Hibbard, 86, American computer scientist.
Douglas Inman, 95, American oceanographer.
*Jung Byung-tak, 75, South Korean football player and manager.
John Baptist Kakubi, 86, Ugandan Roman Catholic prelate, Bishop of Mbarara (1969–1991).
Ellison Kelly, 80, American-born Canadian football player (Hamilton Tiger-Cats, Toronto Argonauts), heart failure.
Philip A. Kuhn, 82, British-born American sinologist.
Warren Manzi, 60, American playwright (Perfect Crime), pneumonia.
Mildred Shapley Matthews, 100, American science writer.
Juan Mujica, 72, Uruguayan football player and manager.
Sohrab Rahimi, 53, Iranian-born Swedish poet.
Kevin Randleman, 44, American mixed martial artist, UFC Heavyweight Champion (1999–2000), pneumonia and heart failure.
Ferenc Rudas, 94, Hungarian football player and manager (Ferencvárosi TC).
Arthur Tunstall, 93, Australian sports administrator.
John Keith Wells, 94, American Marine platoon commander (2nd Battalion 28th Marines). 
Kim Williams, 68, American songwriter ("Three Wooden Crosses").
Peter Wood, 90, English theatre director.
*Zeng Xuelin, 86, Chinese football player and manager (Tianjin, national team).

12
Eddie Barry, 96, American ice hockey player (Boston Bruins).
Kekuni Blaisdell, 90, American Hawaii sovereign activist and professor of medicine, respiratory failure. 
Oscar Camilión, 86, Argentine lawyer and diplomat, Minister of Defense (1993–1996), Foreign Minister (1981).
Dominique D'Onofrio, 62, Italian-born Belgian football coach.
Kenny Easterday, 42, American actor and "man with half a body" due to sacral agenesis.
Braulio Manuel Fernández, 74, Mexican politician.
Robert Frederick Froehlke, 93, American lawyer, Secretary of the Army (1971–1973).
Bergljot Hobæk Haff, 90, Norwegian novelist.
Barbara Hardy, 92, British author.
Keith Jeffery, 64, Northern Irish historian.
Martin Jensen, 74, Norwegian triple jumper.
Giannis Kalaitzis, 70, Greek cartoonist and caricaturist.
Sossen Krohg, 92, Norwegian actress (Hotel Cæsar).
Johnny Lattner, 83, American football player (Notre Dame, Pittsburgh Steelers).
Yvonne Porcella, 79, American quilt artist.
Bennie Purcell, 86, American basketball player (Murray State University, Washington Generals) and tennis coach.
Henri Rey, 83, French Olympic basketball player.
Hugo Tassara, 92, Chilean football manager.
George Tipton, 84, American composer and arranger.
*Yan Su, 85, Chinese playwright and lyricist, cerebral infarction.
Xymena Zaniewska-Chwedczuk, 91, Polish scenographer, architect and fashion designer.

13
Angela Bairstow, 73, English badminton player.
Nathan Barksdale, 54, American heroin dealer, dramatized in The Wire.
Yvonne Barr, 83, Irish virologist, discovered Epstein–Barr virus.
Avigdor Ben-Gal, 79, Israeli general, GOC Northern Command (1977–1981).
Flakey Dove, 30, British racehorse, winner of the 1994 Champion Hurdle, euthanized.
Robin Ghosh, 76, Bangladeshi composer.
Trifon Ivanov, 50, Bulgarian footballer (national team), heart attack.
Barry Jones, 74, New Zealand Roman Catholic prelate, Bishop of Christchurch (since 2007).
O. N. V. Kurup, 84, Indian poet, recipient of the Jnanpith Award (2007).
Edward J. McCluskey, 86, American electrical engineer.
Rafael Moreno Valle, 98, Mexican military physician and politician, Governor of Puebla (1969–1972), Secretary of Health (1964–1968).
Giorgio Rossano, 76, Italian Olympic footballer (1960).
Slobodan Santrač, 69, Serbian football player (Yugoslavia) and manager, heart attack.
Antonin Scalia, 79, American judge, Associate Justice of the Supreme Court (since 1986).
Mike Shepherdson, 85, Malaysian Olympic hockey player (1956) and cricketer (national team).
Bořek Šípek, 66, Czech architect and designer, cancer.
Bud Webster, 63, American science fiction and fantasy writer.
Sir Christopher Zeeman, 91, British mathematician.

14
Eric Lubbock, 4th Baron Avebury, 87, British politician, MP for Orpington (1962–1970), acute myeloid leukaemia.
Peter Bottome, 78, Venezuelan businessman (Empresas 1BC).
 Ali Brownlee, 56, English radio sports broadcaster (Middlesbrough F.C. on BBC Tees), bowel cancer.
Muriel Casals i Couturier, 70, Spanish economist and Catalan independence leader, President of Òmnium Cultural (2010-2015), Catalonia MP (since 2015), brain injury.
Joanne M. Cohoon, 61, American sociologist.
Max Gruenberg, 72, American politician, member of the Alaska House of Representatives (1985–1993, since 2003).
Drewe Henley, 75, British actor (Star Wars, Hell Boats, When Dinosaurs Ruled the Earth), asphyxiation.
David Hey, 77, English historian. 
Mitchell Higginbotham, 94, American World War II veteran, member of the Tuskegee Airmen.
Anselmo López, 81, Venezuelan bandola player.
Wiesław Rudkowski, 69, Polish boxer, Olympic silver medalist (1972).
Steven Stucky, 66, American classical music composer, brain tumor.
L. C. Ulmer, 87, American blues musician.

15
Paul Bannon, 59, Irish footballer (Carlisle United, Cork City).
Paulo Barreto Menezes, 90, Brazilian civil engineer and politician, Governor of Sergipe (1971–1975).
Piero Buscaroli, 85, Italian musicologist.
Alcibíades Colón, 96, Dominican baseball player.
Mary Dodson, 83, American art director (Murder, She Wrote, Full House, Taxi), complications from Parkinson's Disease.
Lewis Feild, 59, American rodeo cowboy, pancreatic cancer.
Edward T. Foote II, 78, American educator, President of the University of Miami (1981–2001).
George Gaynes, 98, Finnish-born American actor (Police Academy, Punky Brewster, Tootsie).
Constance Glube, 84, Canadian judge, Chief Justice of Nova Scotia (1998–2004).
Victor Goldbloom, 92, Canadian politician.
Abdul Rahman Al-Hanaqtah, 52–53, Jordanian politician, member of the House of Representatives (2007–2013).
Virgil Jester, 88, American baseball player (Boston Braves/Milwaukee Braves), pneumonia.
Jerzy Kroh, 91, Polish chemist.
Louis Lane, 92, American conductor.
Walter McGowan, 73, Scottish boxer, world champion (1966).
Muhayadin Mohamed, Somali politician, Defence Minister (2008), explosion.
Salman Natour, 67, Israeli Palestinian author.
W. F. H. Nicolaisen, 88, German-born Scottish scholar.
Joyce Paul, 78, American country music singer.
Carlos Quintero Arce, 96, Mexican Roman Catholic prelate, Archbishop of Hermosillo (1968–1996).
Hans Posthumus, 68, Dutch footballer (Feyenoord, NEC).
Jean Rabier, 88, French cinematographer (The Umbrellas of Cherbourg).
Fighton Simukonda, 58, Zambian football player (Nkana Red Devils) and manager (national team), diabetes.
Steve Thompson, 50, American football player.
Vanity, 57, Canadian singer (Vanity 6), actress (The Last Dragon), and evangelist, renal failure.

16
Alisa Bellettini, 61, American television producer, creator of House of Style.
Ronnie Blackman, 90, English footballer (Reading).
Boutros Boutros-Ghali, 93, Egyptian politician and diplomat, Secretary-General of the United Nations (1992–1996), complications from a fall.
Eugenio Carmi, 95, Italian painter and sculptor.
Fred V. Cherry, 87, American military pilot, POW during the Vietnam War, heart disease.
Mircea Costache II, 75, Romanian handball player (Dinamo București, national team) and coach (Algeria, Portugal), world champion (1961, 1964).
Srđan Dizdarević, 63, Bosnian diplomat and journalist.
Jack Elrod, 91, American cartoonist (Mark Trail).
Gustavo Julian Garcia, 43, American criminal, execution by lethal injection.
Douglas Haynes, 80, Canadian abstract painter.
Mahmudul Islam, 79, Bangladeshi lawyer, Attorney General (1998–2001).
Gregorio Garavito Jiménez, 96, Colombian Roman Catholic prelate, Bishop of Villavicencio (1969–1994).
Mike Greenstein, 95, American strongman.
Lou Holland, 74, American football player (Chicago Bears, British Columbia Lions) and investment management executive, Grey Cup champion (1964).
Bernard Kirschenbaum, 91, American artist.
Herbert Louis, 87, American orthopedic surgeon.
Arman Manaryan, 86, Iranian-born Armenian film director.
Belinda Nash, 69, Canadian-born American historian, cancer.
Jim Pleass, 92, Welsh cricketer (Glamorgan). 
Jože Pogačnik, 83, Slovenian film director.
Charles Caldwell Ryrie, 90, American theologian.
Robert Walker, 87, American sailor, Master Chief Petty Officer of the Navy (1975–1979).

17
Arthur J. Aasland, 82, Norwegian executive (Kongsberg Våpenfabrikk).
Gelu Barbu, 83, Romanian-born Spanish ballet dancer and choreographer.
Jesús Barrero, 57, Mexican actor and voice actor (Saint Seiya), lung cancer.
Eduardo Chirinos, 55, Peruvian poet.
Elias P. Demetracopoulos, 87, Greek journalist and activist, involved in the Watergate scandal.
François Fourquet, 76, French economist.
Andy Ganteaume, 95, Trinidadian cricketer (West Indies).
Alexander Gutman, 71, Russian film director (Journey Back to Youth).
Eddie Haigh, 80, British trade unionist.
Sophia Hawthorne, 39, New Zealand actress.
Mohamed Hassanein Heikal, 92, Egyptian journalist, kidney disease.
Noela Hjorth, 75, Australian artist.
Michael Jaharis, 87, American businessman and philanthropist.
Akbar Kakkattil, 61, Indian writer, lung cancer.
Archie Lang, 95, American actor (Dallas, General Hospital).
Liu Wan-lai, 89, Taiwanese translator.
Brock Pemberton, 62, American baseball player (New York Mets).
Tony Phillips, 56, American baseball player (Oakland Athletics, Detroit Tigers, Chicago White Sox), World Series champion (1989), heart attack.
George Redmond, 92, Irish politician.
Norbert Verougstraete, 81, Belgian Olympic cyclist.
Ray West, 90, American sound mixer (Star Wars, Star Trek II: The Wrath of Khan, Caddyshack), Oscar winner (1978).
Andrzej Żuławski, 75, Polish film director and writer, cancer.

18
Victorico Chaves, 83, Filipino sports administrator and politician. 
Harold C. Conklin, 89, American anthropologist.
Jim Davenport, 82, American baseball player (San Francisco Giants), heart failure.
Sir Tony Durant, 88, British politician, MP (1974–1997).
Jo-Ann Episkenew, 63, Canadian author and indigenous rights activist.
Rosario Ferré, 77, Puerto Rican writer, poet, and essayist, First Lady (1970–1972). 
Rudolf Fischer, 92, Romanian historian and linguist.
Paul Gordon, 52, American musician (New Radicals, The B-52's), complications from heart disease.
Brendan Healy, 59, English actor and musician, cancer.
Abdul Rashid Khan, 107, Indian Hindustani musician.
Bruce Lacey, 89, British artist and actor.
Horst Mittelstaedt, 92, German biologist.
Johnny Miller, 65, English footballer (Ipswich), cancer.
Tom Mullica, 67, American comedy magician and actor (Finding Forrester), complications from surgery.
Cherussery Zainuddeen Musliyar, 78, Indian religious scholar.
Pantelis Pantelidis, 32, Greek singer-songwriter, traffic collision.
Sigmund Pritchard, 86, Bahamian Olympic sailor.
Angela Raiola, 55, American television personality (Mob Wives, Big Ang), lung and throat cancer.
John Reinhardt, 95, American diplomat, United States Ambassador to Nigeria (1971–1975).
Don Rossiter, 80, English footballer and politician.
Karl Stirner, 92, German-born American sculptor.
Thyge Thøgersen, 89, Danish Olympic runner.
Giorgio Tinazzi, 81, Italian footballer.
Yūko Tsushima, 68, Japanese author.
Arumugam Vijiaratnam, 94, Singaporean athlete and Olympic hockey player (1956).

19
Tamerlan Aguzarov, 52, Russian politician, Head of North Ossetia-Alania (since 2015), complications from pneumonia.
Humbert Allen Astredo, 86, American actor (Dark Shadows).
John Binotto, 96, American football player.
Mary Groves Bland, 80, American politician, member of the Missouri House of Representatives (1981–1998) and Missouri Senate (1998–2005), Alzheimer's disease.
Din Joe Crowley, 70, Irish footballer (Rathmore, East Kerry).
Harald Devold, 51, Norwegian jazz musician, cancer.
Umberto Eco, 84, Italian philosopher and novelist (The Name of the Rose, Foucault's Pendulum, Numero Zero), pancreatic cancer.
Ariel Forman, 72, Israeli actor and voice actor, lung cancer.
Freddie Goodwin, 82, English football player (Manchester United, Leeds) and manager (Birmingham).
Sir Anthony Hidden, 79, British judge.
Harper Lee, 89, American author (To Kill a Mockingbird).
Chiaki Morosawa, 56, Japanese anime screenwriter (Mobile Suit Gundam SEED), aortic dissection. 
Sir William O'Brien, 99, British admiral, Naval Secretary (1964–1966).
Vi Subversa, 80, British musician (Poison Girls).
Mutsuo Tahara, 72, Japanese judge. 
Charlie Tuna, 71, American radio personality.
Samuel Willenberg, 93, Polish-born Israeli sculptor and painter, last survivor of the Treblinka extermination camp prisoners' revolt.
Bruno Zuppiger, 63, Swiss politician.

20
Pia Bech Mathiesen, 54, Danish designer and businesswoman, cancer.
Fernando Cardenal, 82, Nicaraguan priest and politician, Minister of Education (1984–1990).
Kevin Collins, 69, American MLB baseball player (New York Mets, Montreal Expos, Detroit Tigers).
Moisés Dagdug Lützow, 65, Mexican politician, stabbed.
Ove Verner Hansen, 83, Danish actor and opera singer, heart attack.
Kim Seong-jip, 97, South Korean weightlifter, Olympic bronze medalist (1948, 1952) and Asian Games champion (1954).
Steven Pirika Kama, 54, Papua New Guinean Bougainvillean politician, member of the National Parliament (since 2008).
Mike McCoy, 62, American football player (Green Bay Packers).
Peter Mondavi, 101, American wine producing pioneer. 
José Moës, 92, Belgian footballer 
Muhamed Mujić, 82, Bosnian Yugoslav footballer, Olympic silver medallist (1956).
Dave Needle, 68, American computer engineer.
Jon Rollason, 84, British actor (The Avengers, Coronation Street, Doctor Who).
Pradeep Shakthi, 60, Indian actor and restaurateur. 
Renee Valente, 88, American film and television producer (A Storm in Summer), Emmy-winner (2001).
Xie Jialin, 95, Chinese physicist and academician (Chinese Academy of Sciences). 
Nando Yosu, 76, Spanish football player and manager (Racing de Santander), Alzheimer's disease.

21
María Luisa Alcalá, 72, Mexican actress (El Chavo del Ocho, Dr. Cándido Pérez, Esmeralda).
Akbar Ali, 90, Indian Kannada poet.
Pascal Bentoiu, 88, Romanian composer.
Eric Brown, 97, British test pilot.
John Caldwell, 69, American comic strip artist and cartoonist (Mad), pancreatic cancer.
Roger Chorley, 2nd Baron Chorley, 85, British peer.
Chu Qing, 92, Chinese politician.
Vlasta Dalibor, 94, Czech-born British puppeteer (Pinky and Perky).
Jean-Pierre Detremmerie, 75, Belgian politician, suicide by hanging.
David Duffield, 84, British sports commentator and cyclist, fall.
George Robin Henderson, 74, Scottish mathematician.
Andrew Herxheimer, 90, German-born British clinical pharmacologist. 
Patrick Hodgkinson, 85, British architect. 
Nina Hole, 75, Danish artist. 
Peter Marlow, 63, British news photographer, influenza contracted during a stem cell transplant.
Harry Hulmes, 88, American football executive.
Ivan M. Matheson, 89, American politician.
René Matte, 81, Canadian politician.
Kalanidhi Narayanan, 87, Indian classical dancer.
Miroslav Nemirov, 54, Russian poet, cancer.
Don Owen, 84, Canadian film director (The Ernie Game).
Albert Rhoton Jr., 83, American neurosurgeon.
Marcus George Singer, 90, American philosopher. 
Debbie Smith, 60, American politician, member of the Nevada Senate (since 2012), brain cancer.
Richard Horner Thompson, 89, American army general.
Betty Jane Watson, 94, American actress and singer.

22
Christian Berg-Nielsen, 95, Norwegian diplomat.
Barbara M. Clark, 76, American politician, member of the New York State Assembly (since 1987).
Wesley A. Clark, 88, American computer engineer (LINC), atherosclerotic cardiovascular disease.
Cristiana Corsi, 39, Italian Olympic taekwondo martial artist (2000, 2004), European champion (2002).
Eileen Foley, 97, American politician, Mayor of Portsmouth, New Hampshire (1968–1971, 1984–1985, 1988–1997), seven-term member of the New Hampshire Senate.
Yolande Fox, 87, American beauty queen (Miss America 1951) and operatic soprano, lung cancer.
Steve Harris, 52, American basketball player (Houston Rockets, Golden State Warriors, Detroit Pistons), colon cancer.
Sonny James, 87, American country singer-songwriter ("Young Love").
Cara McCollum, 24, American journalist and beauty queen, Miss New Jersey (2013), traffic collision.
Hans Reffert, 69, German musician and composer.
Douglas Slocombe, 103, British cinematographer (Indiana Jones, The Lion in Winter, Julia), complications from a fall.
Yochanan Sofer, 93, Hungarian-born Israeli rabbi, Rebbe of Erlau, pneumonia.
Lev Zbarsky, 84, Russian painter, lung cancer.

23
Waqar Ahmed, 68, Pakistani cricketer (Punjab).
José Artecona, 83, Puerto Rican Olympic sports shooter.
Jaime Ornelas Camacho, 95, Portuguese politician, President of Madeira (1976–1978).
Rey Caney, 89, Cuban musician.
Ramón Castro Ruz, 91, Cuban farmer and quartermaster (Cuban Revolution).
Bill Carmody, 58, American Catholic priest, cancer.
Lies Cosijn, 84, Dutch ceramist.
Angel Gabriele, 60, American comic book artist and wrestler.
Valérie Guignabodet, 48, French film director, cardiac arrest.
László Gyöngyösi, 88, Hungarian Olympic swimmer.
Antanas Janauskas, 78, Lithuanian animated film director.
Darlene Jones, 62, American indoor football team owner (San Angelo Stampede Express) and league commissioner (LSFL, CIF), cancer.
Slobodan Lang, 70, Croatian politician.
Peter Lustig, 78, German television presenter and author.
Luis Alberto Machado, 84, Venezuelan lawyer and politician.
Madison Marye, 90, American politician, member of the Senate of Virginia (1973–2002). 
Jacqueline Mattson, 87, American baseball player (Kenosha Comets, Springfield Sallies).
Havo Molisale, 53, Ni-Vanuatu politician, member of Parliament (since 2008), Foreign Minister (2015–2016), Deputy Speaker (since 2016).
Burt Nodella, 91, American television producer (Get Smart).
Tosun Terzioğlu, 74, Turkish mathematician.
Joaquim Veà Baró, 57, Spanish Catalan primatologist.
Donald E. Williams, 74, American astronaut.

24
A. K. N. Ahmed, 85, Bangladeshi economist and diplomat, Governor of Bangladesh Bank (1974–1976), Ambassador to Japan and South Korea, stroke.
Lennie Baker, 69, American musician and singer (Sha Na Na).
Ryszard Bender, 84, Polish politician and historian, Senator (2007–2011).
Adriana Benetti, 96, Italian actress (Four Steps in the Clouds, Teresa Venerdì, Before the Postman). 
Carlos Cámara, 82, Dominican-born Mexican actor.
Miguel Ángel Coria, 78, Spanish composer.
Michael Atul D'Rozario, 90, Bangladeshi Roman Catholic prelate, Bishop of Khulna (1970–2005).
Ronnie Edwards, 63, American politician and civil rights activist, pancreatic cancer.
Eddie Einhorn, 80, American broadcasting (TVS, CBS Sports, Sportsvision) and baseball (Chicago White Sox) executive, complications from a stroke.
Ken English, 89, New Zealand rugby league player (Wellington, national team).
Ragnar Gustafsson, 85, Swedish Olympic equestrian.
Rafael Iriondo, 97, Spanish international football player and manager.
Colin Low, 89, Canadian filmmaker (Universe).
Nabil Maleh, 79, Syrian film director.
Ladislav Matetić, 88, Croatian Olympic rower.
Jim McFadzean, 77, Scottish footballer (Kilmarnock, Heart of Midlothian).
Peter van de Merwe, 74, Dutch footballer.
S. F. C. Milsom, 92, English barrister and legal historian. 
Ove Bech Nielsen, 83, Danish footballer.
George C. Nichopoulos, 88, American physician.
Billie Nipper, 86, American painter.
Northern Spur, 25, Irish-born French and American Thoroughbred racehorse, winner of Prix du Lys (1994) and Breeders' Cup Turf (1995). (death announced on this date)
James C. Russell, 87, American politician, member of the Missouri House of Representatives (1962–1988), skin cancer.
Yordan Sokolov, 83, Bulgarian politician, Chairperson of the National Assembly (1997–2001).
Timber Country, 24, American Thoroughbred racehorse, winner of Preakness Stakes (1995).

25
Sam Beall, 39, American restaurateur (Blackberry Farm) and resort executive, blunt force trauma while skiing. 
Bob Bryant, 71, American politician, member of the Georgia House of Representatives (since 2005).
Tony Burton, 78, American actor (Rocky, Assault on Precinct 13, The Shining), pneumonia.
John Chilton, 83, British jazz musician and writer.
Jim Clark, 84, British film editor (The World Is Not Enough, The Killing Fields, Marathon Man), Oscar winner (1985).
Ian Davis, 77, Australian politician, member of the Victorian Legislative Assembly for Essendon (1992–1996).
Brian Barnett Duff, 85, American judge and politician.
François Dupeyron, 65, French film director and screenwriter (The Officers' Ward).
Miloš Hájek, 94, Czech historian, signatory and spokesperson of Charter 77.
Bhavarlal Jain, 78, Indian businessman (Jain Irrigation Systems).
Sir Peter Kenilorea, 72, Solomon Islands politician, Prime Minister (1978–1981, 1984–1986).
John Kidd, 69, Australian athlete, Paralympic silver medallist (1976).
Gillis Lundgren, 86, Swedish furniture designer (IKEA).
Alfred E. Mann, 90, American entrepreneur.
Otto-Werner Mueller, 89, German conductor.
Irén Psota, 86, Hungarian actress.
Habib-ur-Rehman, 85, Pakistani actor, brain hemorrhage.
William Schaap, 75, American lawyer, author and publisher (CovertAction Quarterly), pulmonary disease.
Zdeněk Smetana, 90, Czech artist and animator.
Mark Young, 48, American wrestler (WWE).

26
Mirza Mohammed Athar, 79, Indian Muslim cleric, pneumonia.
Andy Bathgate, 83, Canadian Hall of Fame ice hockey player (New York Rangers, Toronto Maple Leafs, Detroit Red Wings).
C. L. Blast, 81, American soul singer.
William Y. Cooper, 82, American artist.
Karl Dedecius, 94, Polish-born German translator.
Nina Dorda, 91, Russian singer. 
Jack Forrest, 92, New Zealand rugby league player (West Coast, national team).
B. K. Garudachar, 99, Indian cricket player.
Don Getty, 82, Canadian football player (Edmonton Eskimos) and politician, Premier of Alberta (1985–1992), heart failure.
Antony Gibbs, 90, British film editor (Tom Jones, Fiddler on the Roof, Dune).
Eri Klas, 76, Estonian conductor.
Ivan Kristoffersen, 85, Norwegian newspaper editor (Nordlys).
*Loh I-Cheng, 92, Taiwanese diplomat, Ambassador to Guatemala and South Africa (1990–1996).
Michael S. Longuet-Higgins, 90, British mathematician and oceanographer (Cambridge University).
Juan Conway McNabb, 90, American-born Peruvian Roman Catholic prelate, Bishop of Chulucanas (1988–2000), heart failure.
Thadeo Ouano, 71, Filipino politician, mayor of Mandaue (1998–2007).
Robert Palladino, 83, American calligrapher and academic.
Robert Struble Jr., 72, American historian and author.

27
Winston Blake, 75, Jamaican record producer.
Michael Bowes-Lyon, 18th Earl of Strathmore and Kinghorne, 58, Scottish aristocrat, cancer.
Dick Bradsell, 56, British bartender, brain cancer. 
James Z. Davis, 72, American judge, member of the Utah Court of Appeals (1993–2015).
David Douglas, 52, American football player (Cincinnati Bengals, New England Patriots), brain cancer.
Yushu Kitano, 85, Japanese wrestler, Olympic silver medalist (1952).
Francisco Kraus Trujillo, 89, Spanish baritone.
Lúcio Lara, 86, Angolan politician.
*Lee Khoon Choy, 92, Singaporean politician and diplomat, MLA (1959–1965), MP (1965–1984), ambassador to Japan, South Korea, Indonesia and Egypt.
Claude Parent, 93, French architect.
Vid Pečjak, 87, Slovene psychologist and writer.
Peter N. Perretti Jr., 84, American lawyer, Attorney General of New Jersey (1989–1990).
Rajesh Pillai, 41, Indian film director (Traffic), complications from non-alcoholic fatty liver disease.
Steven Rumbelow, 66, British theatre and film director (Autumn), sepsis.
Farajollah Salahshoor, 63, Iranian film director.
Anna-Leena Siikala, 73, Finnish academic.
Bob Spicer, 90, American baseball player (Kansas City Athletics).
Rian Sukmawan, 30, Indonesian badminton player, heart attack.
Wiswa Warnapala, 79, Sri Lankan politician, MP (2004–2010).
Elmer Wingate, 88, American lacrosse and football player (Baltimore Colts), Alzheimer's disease.
Yi Cheol-seung, 93, South Korean politician.

28
Sengai Aaliyan, 75, Sri Lankan author.
Don Battye, 77, Australian composer and television producer.
Didier Bellens, 60, Belgian businessman, CEO of Belgacom.
Delmer Berg, 100, American resistance fighter (Spanish Civil War), last known American member of XV International Brigade.
Moisés Julio Blanchoud, 92, Argentine Roman Catholic prelate, Archbishop of Salta (1984–1999).
Honey Chhaya, 85, Indian film director and actor (The Best Exotic Marigold Hotel). 
Stephen Clarkson, 78, Canadian political scientist and academic (University of Toronto), sepsis following influenza and pneumonia.
Paul Colinvaux, 85, British ecologist and author (Fates of Nations).
John Cameron, Lord Coulsfield, 81, Scottish judge (Pan Am Flight 103 bombing trial), Senator of the College of Justice (1987–1992).
Bram Goldsmith, 93, American banker, CEO and Chairman of City National Bank, philanthropist.
John Johnson, 98, American athletics and football trainer (New York Giants).
John Jones, 91, English author and academic.
John Philip Kassebaum, 84, American attorney and art collector.
Frank Kelly, 77, Irish actor (Father Ted, Emmerdale, Evelyn), heart attack.
George Kennedy, 91, American actor (Cool Hand Luke, The Naked Gun, Airport), Oscar winner (1968), heart disease.
Kumarimuthu, 76, Indian comedian and film actor.
Jack Lindquist, 88, American child actor and theme park executive, President of Disneyland (1990–1993).
Raúl Sánchez, 82, Chilean footballer (national team).
Jan H van der Merwe, 94, South African physicist.
Craig Windham, 66, American radio broadcaster (National Public Radio), pulmonary embolism.
Liliane Wouters, 86, Belgian author.

29
Alice Arlen, 75, American screenwriter (Silkwood, The Weight of Water).
Stuart Beck, 69, American-Palauan diplomat, Ambassador to the United Nations for Palau (2003–2013), renal cancer.
Rudy Bukich, 85, American football player (Chicago Bears), NFL champion (1963).
Wenn V. Deramas, 49, Filipino film and television director, heart attack.
Helias Doundoulakis, 92, American Greek WWII resistance fighter.
Gil Hill, 84, American police officer, actor (Beverly Hills Cop) and politician (Detroit City Council), pneumonia.
John Hofsess, 77, Canadian writer and right to die activist.
Fernand Jourdenais, 82, Canadian politician.
Hannes Löhr, 73, German football player and manager.
Josefin Nilsson, 46, Swedish singer, enlarged heart and barbiturate overdose.
José Parra Martínez, 90, Spanish footballer (Espanyol).
Francis Xavier Osamu Mizobe, 80, Japanese Roman Catholic prelate, Bishop of Sendai (2000–2004) and Takamatsu (2004–2011).
Mumtaz Qadri, 30–31, Pakistani convicted murderer (Salmaan Taseer), execution by hanging.
Louise Rennison, 64, British author (Angus, Thongs and Full-Frontal Snogging).
Conrad Santos, 81, Filipino-born Canadian politician, MLA for Burrows (1981–1988), Broadway (1990–1999) and Wellington (1999–2007).
Henry Snyder, 86, American historian.
Shōichi Ueno, 79, Japanese newspaper publisher (Asahi Shimbun) and philanthropist, lung cancer.
Nihal Ahmed Maulavi Mohammed Usman, 90, Indian politician, Maharashtra MLA (1960–1999), mayor of Malegaon.
Ana Vieira, 76, Portuguese artist.
Ranginui Walker, 83, New Zealand academic and writer.

References

2016-02
 02